Rasno is a Serbian toponym that may refer to:

Rasno, Široki Brijeg, a village in Bosnia and Herzegovina
Rasno (Prijepolje), a village in Serbia
Rasno (Sjenica), a village in Serbia

Serbo-Croatian place names